Saint-François-de-Madawaska (2016 pop.: 470) is a former Canadian village in Madawaska County, New Brunswick.

The village is known as the province's "Chicken Capital", referring to its role in the poultry industry. Former and merged names for the community include Webster's Creek and Winding Ledges.

Nearby attractions include Glazier Lake and the Forges Jos B. Michaud, a blacksmith museum.

The largest employers of the village include a poultry slaughtering factory and processing plant owned by Maple Lodge, two chicken-raising company owned by Westco.

Demographics

Population trend

Mother tongue (2016)

History

Notable people

See also
List of communities in New Brunswick

References

Communities in Madawaska County, New Brunswick
Former villages in New Brunswick